Drag Race France is a French reality competition television series based on the original American series RuPaul's Drag Race and part of the Drag Race franchise. It airs on the digital channel France.tv Slash in France and on WOW Presents Plus internationally.

Drag Race France debuted on June 25, 2022, on France.tv Slash. Episodes premiere on a weekly basis every Thursday and also stream simultaneously on France.tv catch-up service and on Salto, and later aired on France 2 every Saturday night. The series debuted simultaneously on Crave in Canada, and on WOW Presents Plus internationally.

Paloma won the first season, with La Grande Dame and Soa de Muse as runners-up, while Elips was named Miss Congeniality. In August 2022, the series was renewed for a second season.

Production 
Announced by World of Wonder in November 2021, the show is a drag queen contest in which the "next French superstar of drag" is selected. Each week, the candidates are subjected to different challenges and are evaluated by a group of judges including personalities who critique the progress of the participants and their performances.

Judging panel 
It is hosted by French drag queen Nicky Doll, who competed on the twelfth season of RuPaul's Drag Race and placed tenth. Nicky Doll also serves as a judge alongside Daphné Bürki and Kiddy Smile.

Series overview

Season 1 (2022) 

The first season of Drag Race France began airing on 25 June 2022, on France.tv Slash in France and World of Wonder's streaming service WOW Presents Plus internationally. The season ran for 8 episodes and concluded on 11 August 2022. La Grande Dame and Soa de Muse made the final, and Paloma was the winner of the first season.

Contestants 

There has been a total of 10 contestants featured in Drag Race France.

References 

 
2020s LGBT-related reality television series
2022 French television series debuts
France Télévisions original programming
French LGBT-related television shows
French reality television series
French television series based on American television series
WOW Presents Plus original programming